Monasteraden is a village in County Sligo, Ireland.
The village is located on the shores of Lough Gara. 
St Aiden's church is the village's church. 
Other sites include Lough Gara Lodge, Slí na Croí's Roundhouse Ecolodge, Drury's pub and the general store.

Geography
Monasteraden lies to the west of Lough Gara and with the Curlew Mountains inlier of sandstones and conglomerates to the North.  To the west lies the townland of Clogher with Edmondstown and Ballaghaderreen in the neighbouring County Roscommon.

Monasteraden is situated in the barony of Coolavin in the south of County Sligo.

Culture and community

There is a holy well called St Attractas and that is where many people used to get their drinking water.
The lake is used for fishing for the brown trout and is divided by the bridge at Clooncunny.

Transport
Island Road railway station served Monasteraden and used to have many trains passing by on the Ballaghaderreen branch line with connections to Dublin but that was closed in 1963 and the station building is a private home.

One Bus Éireann service a week stops at Monasteraden.
The nearest bus station is in Ballaghaderreen, which is about  miles away and has several buses travelling to and from Dublin daily.

Education
There is a national school, St. Aiden's in Monasteraden.  They have been particularly noted for their work with film, including producing a 32-minute movie entitled "The Train" bringing together rare footage and interviews with local people associated with the Ballaghaderreen branch line which had a station serving they village.

See also
 List of towns and villages in Ireland

References

Towns and villages in County Sligo